Brickell Key is a man-made island off the mainland Brickell neighborhood of Miami, Florida. Also called Claughton Island, the neighborhood is just east of Downtown Miami and the Miami River.

History
In 1943, Edward N. Claughton, Sr. bought the Brickell Key islands and other land to combine them into a  triangle-shaped tract. In the late 1970s, Swire Properties bought most of the island from Claughton.

Demographics
As of 2020, the population of Brickell Key had 20,558 people (excluding the demographics and population of Brickell and Mary Brickell Village). The ZIP code for Brickell is 33131. As of 2020, there were 10,412 males and 10,146 females. The median age for males was 33.9 years old, while the median age for females was 31.9 years old. The average household size had 1.7 people, while the average family size had 2.5 members. The percentage of married-couple families (among all households) was 30.6%, while the percentage of married-couple families with children (among all households) was 8.2%, and the percentage of single-mother households (among all households) was 1.4%. The percentage of never-married males 15 years old and over was 24.4%, while the percentage of never-married females 15 years old and over was 16.4%.

, people who speak English not well or not at all, made up 5.9% of the population. The percentage of residents born in Florida was 14.9%, the percentage of people born in another U.S. state was 29.1%, and the percentage of native residents but born outside the U.S. was 4.7%, while the percentage of foreign born residents was 51.3%.

Gallery

References

External links

Artificial islands of Florida
Islands of Miami
Islands of Miami-Dade County, Florida
Neighborhoods in Miami
Planned communities in Florida